De Hatsumermolen  is a smock mill in Dronryp, Friesland, Netherlands which was built in 1878. The mill is listed as a Rijksmonument, number 28615.

History
In 1841, a spinnenkopmolen stood on this site. De Hatsumermolen was built in 1878 by millwright N J Osinga. It drained the  Sikma Polder, which formed part of the Hommema State farmstead. Restoration work on the mill began in 1987 and was completed 1990. The mill was officially opened on 23 October 1991 by Pieter van Vollenhoven. Repairs were carried out to the cap in 2003.

Description

De Hatsumermolen is what the Dutch describe as a "grondzeiler" . It is a two-storey smock mill on a single-storey base. There is no stage, the sail reaching almost to the ground. The smock and cap covered in weatherboards, which are vertical on the smock. The mill is winded by tailpole and winch. The sails are Common sails. The sails are carried on a cast-iron windshaft which was cast by Gietijzerij Hardinxveld  of Giessendam, South Holland. The windshaft also carries the brake wheel which has 31 cogs. This drives the wallower (16 cogs) at  the top of the upright shaft. At the bottom of the upright shaft, the crown wheel, which has 32 cogs drives a gearwheel with 29 cogs on the axle of the wooden Archimedes' screw. The screw is inclined at 34°. Each revolution of the screw lifts  of water.

Public access
De Hatsumermolen is open to the public by appointment.

References

External links

Windmills in Friesland
Windmills completed in 1878
Smock mills in the Netherlands
Windpumps in the Netherlands
Rijksmonuments in Friesland
Octagonal buildings in the Netherlands
Waadhoeke